Saturday Morning is a 2007 American comedy film written and directed by Rob Greenberg and starring Joey Piscopo, George Wendt, Valerie R. Feingold, Louis Mandylor, Ashley Carin, Victor Raider-Wexler, Beth Ostrosky, and Lillo Brancato, Jr.

Premise
A dull, office dwelling loser named Wes Selman gets a strange birthday present from an uncle to get his house painted forcing him to awake at 6 a.m. and leading him on a two-hour odyssey through a strange other world where everything magically goes his way till 8 a.m. that Saturday morning.

References

External links

DVD Talk review
Official site

2007 films
2007 comedy films
American comedy films
2000s English-language films
2000s American films